Krista Duchene (born January 9, 1977) is a Canadian track and field athlete competing in the marathon.

History
In 2010, DuChene won the national Canadian title

In 2013, DuChene won the Canadian Half Marathon Championships at the Banque Scotia 21K de Montréal and made her IAAF World Championships debut at the 2013 in Moscow but collapsed at the 13km mark due to extremely hot conditions. DuChene was one of 25 competitors unable to finish the race. 

In April 2014 during the Montreal half-marathon DuChene broke her right femur. Feeling pain with 5km to go but with 500m to go the undiagnosed stress fracture turned into a full fracture where the femur meets the hip bone. Pushing forward, she finished in third place. DuChene underwent surgery to implant a plate and three screws causing her to miss the 2014 Commonwealth Games and 2015 Pan Am Games.

In July 2016 she was included into Canada's Olympic team.  She competed in the Marathon for Canada at the 2016 Summer Olympics in Rio de Janeiro, Brazil finishing 35th of the 133 behind fellow Canadian Lanni Marchant in 24th.

In October 2016, she won the Canadian Marathon Championships at the Toronto Waterfront Marathon.

At the 2018 Boston Marathon, she finished third. 

On March 5, 2023, she finished the Tokyo Marathon in a time of 2:38:53, breaking the Canadian +45 Women’s record.

See also
 Canadian Marathon Championships
Canadian Half Marathon Championships
Athletics at the 2016 Summer Olympics – Women's marathon
2013 World Championships in Athletics – Women's marathon

References

External links

Official website

1977 births
Living people
Canadian female marathon runners
People from Strathroy-Caradoc
Athletes (track and field) at the 2016 Summer Olympics
Olympic track and field athletes of Canada

Canadian female long-distance runners